Cole H. Conley (born November 27, 1950) is an American politician serving as a member of the North Dakota Senate from the 12th district. Elected in November 2020, he assumed office on December 1, 2020.

Early life and education 
Conley was born and raised in Jamestown, North Dakota. He attended the University of North Dakota.

Career 
Prior to entering politics, Conley worked as a farmer. He was also a sales associate at the Wallwork Truck Center. Conley was elected to the North Dakota Senate in November 2020 and assumed office on December 1, 2020.

References 

1950 births
Living people
People from Jamestown, North Dakota
University of North Dakota alumni
Republican Party North Dakota state senators